The 2005 Cork Intermediate Hurling Championship was the 96th staging of the Cork Intermediate Hurling Championship since its establishment by the Cork County Board in 1909. The draw for the opening round fixtures took place on 12 December 2004. The championship began on 1 May 2005 and ended on 9 October 2005.

On 9 October 2005, Argideen Rangers won the championship after a 2–08 to 1–08 defeat of Nemo Rangers in a final replay at Páirc Uí Rinn. It remains their only championship title in the grade.

Nemo Rangers' James Masters was the championship's top scorer with 3-35.

Team changes

To Championship

Promoted from the Cork Junior A Hurling Championship
 Ballygarvan

From Championship

Promoted to the Cork Premier Intermediate Hurling Championship
 Watergrasshill

Results

First round

Second round

Third round

Quarter-finals

Semi-finals

Finals

Championship statistics

Top scorers

Overall

In a single game

References

Cork Intermediate Hurling Championship
Cork Intermediate Hurling Championship